Kohoku may refer to:
Kohoku, Shiga
Kōhoku, Saga
Kōhoku-ku, Yokohama